Yve-Alain Bois (born April 16, 1952) is a professor of Art History at the School of Historical Studies at the Institute for Advanced Study in Princeton, New Jersey.

Education
Bois received an M.A. from the École Pratique des Hautes Études in 1973 for his work on El Lissitzky's typography, and a Ph.D. from the École des Hautes Études en Sciences Sociales in 1977 for his work on Lissitzky's and Malevich's conceptions of space.  Both of his degrees were supervised under Roland Barthes.

Career

Academic
Bois is a professor at the School of Historical Studies at the Institute for Advanced Study in Princeton, New Jersey, in the chair inaugurated by Erwin Panofsky, and at the European Graduate School. From 1991 to 2005, he served on the faculty at Harvard University as Joseph Pulitzer Jr. Professor in Modern Art, after teaching at Johns Hopkins University and at the Centre National de la Recherche Scientifique.

Bois was elected to the American Philosophical Society in 2016.

Writing
Bois has written books and articles on artists of European modernism. He is an editor of the journal October.

Articles
"Whose Formalism?" Art Bulletin, Mar. 1996 European Graduate School
Review of Tony Smith retrospective at the Museum of Modern Art, New York, Artforum, Nov. 1998
Review of "Supports/Surfaces" exhibition at the Galerie Nationale du Jeu de Paume, Artforum, Dec. 1998
Bois and Linda Nochlin discuss the Matisse and Picasso exhibition, Artforum, Feb. 1999
Review of Barnett Newman retrospective, Philadelphia Museum of Art, Artforum, Mar. 2002
"The Mourning After," panel discussion on painting, Artforum, Mar. 2003
On Fred Sandback, Artforum, Oct. 2003

References

External links 
Bois faculty page at European Graduate School
Interview with Bois for Folha de Sao Paulo, Caderno Mais!, 2005
MIT Press: list of books and articles by Bois
All About Yve: An Interview with Yve-Alain Bois (1995)
"From Art to Barthes and Back Again", The Harvard Crimson, September 19, 1991

1952 births
Living people
People from Constantine, Algeria
Algerian art critics
Algerian art historians
Institute for Advanced Study faculty
Harvard University faculty
Johns Hopkins University faculty
Academic staff of European Graduate School
21st-century Algerian people